Kristian Brinch Koren (May 23, 1863 – February 10, 1938) was a Norwegian historian and archivist. He was appointed national archivist of Norway in 1912, serving from 1913 to 1933.

Early life
Koren was born in Trondheim, the son of the senior physician August Laurentius Koren (1833–1929) and Johanne Cathrine Brinch, and the brother of the diplomat Finn Koren (1875–1966). The family left Trondheim in 1867.

Career
Following his examen artium at Oslo Cathedral School in 1881 and his candidatus philologiæ in Kristiania in the fall of 1889, Koren worked as a volunteer apprentice at the university library and a substitute at the National Archives. On February 20, 1891 he was appointed regional state archivist in Trondheim. In 1896 he succeeded Niels Peter Selmer Arentz as librarian at the library of the Royal Norwegian Society of Sciences and Letters. It was Koren that acquired Thorvald Boeck's enormous book collection for the library in 1899. At that time, Boeck's collection was the largest in Norway, consisting of approximately 31,000 volumes.

Koren was appointed national archivist of Norway on December 6, 1912. He assumed the duties on April 2, 1913, when he relocated to Oslo. As the national archivist, he prepared an archive technology program. He arranged to have new buildings created to house the Regional State Archives in Bergen in 1921 and the Regional State Archives in Trondheim in 1927, and also created new regional archives in Hamar in 1917 and in Kristiansand in 1930. Koren persuaded the Storting to approve construction of a new building for the National Archives in 1929.

Publications
 Fortegnelse over filologer, realister og mineraloger ved Norges Universitet 1813–1884 (Record of Philologists, Scientists, and Mineralogists at the University of Norway, 1813–1884), 1885
 Om kilder til Norges historie i middelalderen i engelske arkiver (Sources of Norway's History in the Middle Ages in English Archives), 1893
 Stamtavle over familien Koren, (The Ancestry of the Koren Family) 1898/1903
 Karter og topografiske tegninger vedk. Trondheim og Trøndelag (Maps and Topographical Drawings Related to Trondheim and Trøndelag), 1899
 Trondhjem i gamle dage. Billeder i lystryk (Trondhjem in the Old Days. Phototype Images), 1907
 Hans Nissens og hustrus stiftelse og arbeidshus (Hans Nissen and His Wife's Foundation and Workhouse), 1907

References

Further reading
 Støren, Wilhelm. 1993. Bibliotekets ledere 1768–1993. In: Til opplysning, pp. 38–40. Trondheim: Tapir.  Digitalized at bokhylla.no

External links
 Kristian Brinch Koren at the National Archival Services of Norway

Norwegian librarians
Directors-General of the National Archives of Norway
People from Trondheim
1863 births
1938 deaths